Powder River is a radio-drama series produced by the Colonial Radio Theatre on the Air.  The series is written by Jerry Robbins, and takes place in Clearmont, Wyoming.  It aired on Imagination Theater.

Episodes

Season One (2004) 

1: "The Preacher"
2: "A Tangled Rope"
3: "A Friend in Need"
4: "Battle at Ricochet Rock"
5: "The Gold Wagon"
6: "Peace of Mind"
7: "The Lost Mine"
8: "Never the Twain"

9: "The Winter Soldier"
10: "The Wind in the Mountain"
11: "The Vengeance Trail"
12: "The Wine of Life"
13: "Mark of a Killer"
14: "Dancing with the Devil"
15: "Thunder on the River"

Season Two (2005) 

16: "New Beginnings"
17: "The Overland Stage"
18: "Jenny White"
19: "War Paint"
20: "An Old Friend"
21: "Blood on Montana Snow"
22: "The Blizzard"
23: "Pray I Don't Catch Up"

24: "The General"
25: "On the Trail of the Big Horn"
26: "Son of the Morning Star"
27: "The Iron Horse"
28: "Ellsworth"
29: "Dr. Whitney"
30: "Nothing is Forever"

Season Three (2006) 

31: "Wanted"
32: "Bandit's Pass"
33: "Just Like Home"
34: "Judge Parker"
35: "The Awful Tooth"
36: "Morgan's Town, Part One"
37: "Morgan's Town, Part Two"
38: "Morgan's Town, Part Three"
39: "Till Death Do Us Part"
40: "The Winds of the Prairie"

41: "The Bride From the East"
42: "The Instant of Unexpected"
43: "The Wagon Boy"
44: "The New Owner"
45: "Moment of Truth"

Season Four (2006) 

46: "Return of the Legend, Part One"
47: "Return of the Legend, Part Two"
48: "The Nitro Gang"
49: "Jack Sherman Escapes"
50: "Twilight"
51: "In Chicago"
52: "Revelations"
53: "Ambush at Powder River"
54: "The Shootin' Arm"
55: "The Tomahawk Trail"

56: "The River Pirates"
57: "The Man in the Iron Mask"
58: "The Railroad"
59: "The Buffalo"
60: "End of Track"

Specials (2007) 
S01: "Guns of Powder River" (Feature-length)
S02: "Powder River and the Mountain of Gold" (Feature-length)

Season Five (2011) 

61: "The Twisted Badge, Part One"
62: "The Twisted Badge, Part Two" 
63: "The Twisted Badge, Part Three"
64: "Rawhoof"
65: "Those We Leave Behind, Part One"
66: "Those We Leave Behind, Part Two"
67: "Into Their Own Hands, Part One"
68: "Into Their Own Hands, Part Two"
69: "Dry Goods and Hardware"
70: "The Rival"

71: "The Tip of the Hand and The Tell of the Eye"
72: "Why Dawes is a Bachelor"
73: "The Gunman"
74: "Happily Ever After"
75: "Clearmont"

Season Six (2012-2013) 

76: "Out of the Blue"
77: "Changes and Tall Tales"
78: "Challenges"
79: "The Ghost"
80: "The Fight part 1"
81: "The Fight part 2"
82: "The Thanksgiving Story part 1"
83: "The Thanksgiving Story part 2"
84: "The River Romance"
85: "The Modern Age"

86: "The New Hat"
87: "The Silent Night"
88: "Conversations"
89: "Doc's Peril"
90: "The Fond Farewell"

Season Seven (2013) 

91: The Cattle On A Thousand Hills, Part 1
92: The Cattle On A Thousand Hills, Part 2
93: The Cattle On A Thousand Hills, Part  3
94: Our Bugles Sang Truce
95: The Wild West Show, Part 1
96: The Wild West Show, Part 2
97: The Map Of Legend
98: The Great Stagecoach Race
99: Pennies On A Dead Mans Eyes
100: The Rustlers
101: The Fire, Part 1
102: The Fire, Part 2

Season Eight (2013) 

103: A Single Bullet
104: The Man Of The Week
105: The Point Of No Return
106: Look Towards The Sunrise
107: From The Ashes Will Rise
108: The Law And His Son
109: The Dying Breed
110: Mrs. Octavia Hudson
111: The Happy Times
112: The Cheyenne Kid
113: The Prisoner Transfer, Part 1
114: The Prisoner Transfer, Part 2

Season Nine (2014) 

115: Across The Rio Grande
116: Camargo
117: Gunfight At Camargo
118: The Ladies And The Outlaw
119: The Prairie League
120: Apache Territory
121: The Shaman, Part 1
122: The Shaman, Part 2
123: Repent!
124: Dan's Mountain
125: The Nightmare Came In With The Storm
126: Stagecoach To Tombstone

Season Ten (2014) 

127: The Summer Visit
128: Incident At Dry Wells
129: Trouble At Coal Creek
130: The Phantom Train
131: The Photograph
132: The Gypsy Curse
133: The Reflection In The Mirror Is Not Mine
134: When Henry M. Teller Came To Town
135: Second Hand Gold
136: The Oil Baron
137: Boom Town
138: Bill Of Sale

Season Eleven (2015) 

139: The Man From Isandlwana, Part 1
140: The Man From Isandlwana, Part 2
141: Arrival
142: When We Trust
143: The Eviction
144: An Opinion Of Judgment
145: Death Cancels Everything
146: The Valley Of No Return
147: Levi And The Pirate
148: The Arrangement
149: Where Do The Years Go?
150: The Darkness Of The Light

Season Twelve (2018-2019) 

151: Lighten the Burden
152: Nothing is Forever
153: Last Train from Kansas City
154: The Homecoming
155: The Left Hook
156: The Renegades
157: Big Business
158: Tea Room of the Golden Nugget
159: The Storm and the Snake
160: The Showgirl
161: Of Love, Marriage and Goodbye
162: In Paris, In Dreams

External links 
 

2000s American radio programs
American radio dramas